Frederick Cuffie Jr., professionally known by his stage name 60 Second Assassin, is an American rapper from New York, who is a member of Wu-Tang Clan affiliated group Sunz of Man. He has released his debut solo studio album Remarkable Timing on June 22, 2010 via Holy Toledo Productions/Sound Records & Entertainment.

Discography
Studio albums
2010 – Remarkable Timing
Mixtapes
2010 – The History of 60
2010 – The Retrospective (A Look Back)

with Sunz of Man
Studio albums
1998 – The Last Shall Be First
2002 – Saviorz Day
2019 - The Rebirth
Mixtapes
1998 – The Sunz of Man Mixtape (with Tony Touch)
2003 – Inmates to the Fire... (hosted by DJ Swarm)
Compilations
2004 – Nothing New Under the Sun
2006 – The Old Testament

Guest appearances

References

External links

1961 births
Living people
Five percenters
Sunz of Man members
American male rappers
Rappers from Brooklyn
Musicians from Brooklyn
Wu-Tang Clan affiliates
East Coast hip hop musicians
20th-century American rappers
21st-century American rappers
African-American male rappers